Mistico may refer to:

Mistico (boat), type of large sailing coaster used by Greek pirates in the Mediterranean in the 18th and 19th centuries

Music
Mistico, a 2007 album by American jazz musician Charlie Hunter
Mistico, a 2009 album by Canadian guitarist Johannes Linstead

Sports
Místico (born 1982), former ring name of Mexican luchador Luis Urive, also known as Sin Cara in World Wrestling Entertainment/WWE
Místico II (born 1992), Mexican luchador currently working for Consejo Mundial de Lucha Libre